Hans Olav Uldal (born 16 December 1982) is a Norwegian track and field athlete. He was born in Arendal, and has represented the clubs IK Grane and Sandnes IL. He competed in decathlon at the 2004 Summer Olympics in Athens, where he placed 27th overall.

References

External links

1982 births
Living people
People from Arendal
Norwegian decathletes
Olympic athletes of Norway
Athletes (track and field) at the 2004 Summer Olympics
Norwegian expatriates in the United States
Sportspeople from Agder